Muḥammad ibn Abi Bakr al-Zuhri of Granada (fl. 1130s–1150s) was a geographer. He was the writer of a notable work,  (Book of Geography). Al-Zuhri was able to use the writings of the geographers of the reign of caliph al-Ma'mun of Baghdad (d. 456/1068). He belonged to the Arab tribe of Banu Zuhrah. Al-Zuhri died between 1154 and 1161.

References

Miquel Barceló, "Comentaris a un text sobre Mallorca del geògraf al-Zuhri", Mayurqa, Vol. 14, 1975, pp. 155–165
George Sarton, Introduction to the History of Science, 1931, page 130

External links
Climate zones of Al-Zuhri (Archived 2009-10-24). (Retrieved November 26, 2008.)

12th-century people from al-Andalus
12th-century Arabs
12th-century geographers
Geographers from Al-Andalus